Drevja is a former municipality in Nordland county, Norway. The municipality existed from 1927 until its dissolution in 1962.  It was located in the Drevja valley, north of the Vefsnfjorden in the northern part of the present-day Vefsn Municipality. Drevja Church was the main church for the municipality.

History

The municipality of Drevja was established on 1 July 1927 when the large Vefsn Municipality was divided into three municipalities: Drevja (population: 964) in the north, Grane (population: 1,746) in the south, and Vefsn (population: 3,119) in the center.

During the 1960s, there were many municipal mergers across Norway due to the work of the Schei Committee. On 1 January 1962, the municipality of Drevja (population: 1,001) was merged with the neighboring municipalities of Elsfjord (population: 920) and Vefsn (population: 5,358) and with the town of Mosjøen) to form a new, larger Vefsn Municipality.

Name
The municipality was named after the river Drevja which flows from the lake Drevvatnet to the Vefsnfjorden. The name of the river is derived from the word  which means "rubbish" or "waste". Thus the meaning of the name is something like "the river with unclean water".

Government
During its existence, this municipality was governed by a municipal council of elected representatives, which in turn elected a mayor.

Municipal council
The municipal council  of Drevja was made up of 13 representatives that were elected to four year terms.  The party breakdown of the final municipal council was as follows:

Mayors
The mayors of Drevja:

 1927–1931: Sigvald Almlid
 1932–1934: Ole Justad
 1935–1940: Martin Hvidsten
 1943–1945: Egil Brattbakk
 1946–1951: Carl P. Scancke
 1952–1956: Thorvald Enge
 1956–1957: Ottar Almlid

See also
List of former municipalities of Norway

References

Vefsn
Former municipalities of Norway
1927 establishments in Norway
1962 disestablishments in Norway